Gare de Pont Cardinet is a railway station in Paris. It is situated on the Paris–Le Havre railway. It is the first station on the line originating from Gare Saint-Lazare, Paris. The station building is situated above the track level alongside Rue Cardinet. The station is equipped with escalators and Solari destination boards.
The main line continues towards Clichy whilst a small line, now closed, branches off towards Pereire-Levallois and links St Lazare to the RER C, this branch was once part of Ligne d'Auteuil and closed in June 1996. Today, there are shuttle buses connecting Pereire-Levallois on RER C. Since December 2020, the station is connected to Paris Métro line 14 with the construction of the Pont Cardinet station.

History 
Originally named Gare des Batignolles, the station opened on May 2, 1854, along with the Auteuil railway.

References

External links

 

Pont Cardinet
Railway stations in France opened in 1854